IPP may refer to:

Organisations

 Independent power producer, electric power generator
 India Pride Project, recovering stolen Indian artefacts
 Istituto per la Protezione delle Piante (Institute of Plant Protection), Italy
 Max-Planck-Institut für Plasmaphysik, a physics institute in Garching, Germany
 Intermountain Power Plant, a coal power plant, Delta, Utah, USA.
 Institute of Particle Physics, organization to promote Canadian excellence in particle physics research

Science and technology
 Isopentenyl pyrophosphate, a metabolite
 Ionospheric pierce point, where a satellite signal crosses the ionosphere
 Induratio penis plastica, Peyronie's disease
 Nob Yoshigahara Puzzle Design Competition, also known as  the International Puzzle Party

Sports
 International Player Pathway, program for non-Americans players in the National Football League

Computing
 Integrated Performance Primitives, a software library
 Internet Printing Protocol
 Insilicos Proteomics Pipeline, biological software tools
 Unbounded interactive polynomial time in computational complexity theory

Politics
 Irish Parliamentary Party or Irish Home Rule Party, UK

Other uses
 Imprisonment for public protection, England
 Individual Pension Plan, Canada 
 International price program, US
 Intellectual Property Protection
 Integrated Product Policy in Life Cycle Thinking
 David Ipp (1938-2020), judge and politician, NSW, Australia
 Ip, Sălaj (Hungarian Ipp), a commune in Romania
 Interpressphoto - alternative photo competition of socialist camp photographers against the World Press Photo competition

 Intractable Pain Patients See: Dr. Forest Tenant